9Lives is the name of a brand of cat food, owned by J.M. Smucker (after it acquired Big Heart Pet Brands, a former division of Del Monte in 2015) and introduced to the market by tuna processor StarKist Foods in 1959. It is best known for its mascot, Morris. 9Lives has four varieties of dry food (Daily Essentials, Plus Care, Indoor Complete and Long Life Formula), and five lines of wet food in various flavors.

The brand also promotes adoption of cats from animal shelters.  In 2006, 9Lives kicked off the inaugural tour of Morris' Million Cat Rescue, a nationwide bus tour to encourage local cat adoption.

9Lives has recently added a new cat to their advertising, Li'l Mo, an orange kitten who has been adopted from a Los Angeles animal shelter putatively by Morris himself.

9Lives was StarKist's flagship pet food brand. In 1963, Heinz acquired StarKist, and by 1969, the first Morris TV commercials aired. Heinz sold StarKist and 9Lives to Del Monte in 2002. Del Monte spun off the pet foods division as Big Heart in 2014.

For a period of time in the late 1970s and early 1980s, 9Lives used Sylvester the Cat from Warner Bros. Looney Tunes and Merrie Melodies cartoons on the packages and in advertising as the mascot for its newly introduced dry cat food. The animated cartoon TV commercials usually consisted of Sylvester trying to get to his box of 9Lives, while avoiding Hector the Bulldog. Sylvester would always succeed in luring the dog away so he could get his food, but he would find himself a target again by the end of the commercial, when Sylvester would always proclaim 9Lives dry food as "worth riskin' your life for!" Sylvester never appeared in commercials for 9Lives canned cat food and by 1986, he would be replaced by Morris for the dry food packaging and advertising.

References

External links
 
cat food supplies
how to train maltipoo
food review

Products introduced in 1959
Cat food brands
Del Monte Foods brands
The J.M. Smucker Co. brands
1959 establishments in the United States